The Braque d'Auvergne is a breed of dog originating in the mountain area of Cantal, in the historic Auvergne province in the mid-south of France. It is a pointer and versatile gundog. The breed descends from ancient regional types of hunting dogs.

Appearance 
It has a large head, long ears, and pendulous lips. The tail was traditionally docked to half its length. The short, glossy coat is white with mottling of black that gives a blue impression, and large black spots. The head and ears are always black.

Temperament 
The Auvergne is lively, sensitive, obedient, and affectionate. Intelligent and good natured, it makes a fine family dog and an excellent hunting partner. It gets along well with other dogs. The Braque d'Auvergne is a natural hunter who tends to work closely with its partner, checking in frequently. This trait, combined with its gentle nature and desire to please, make it a highly trainable pointer.

Exercise 
This hunting dog does best with regular outings during which it can exercise its body, nose and its mind.

History 
The Auvergne pointer has been present in the Cantal region for more than two centuries and was recognized as a French gundog breed with an FCI breed standard in 1955. It was recognised by the Kennel Club (UK) with effect from 1 April 2016. The breed will be classified in the Gundog Group (HPR) on the Imported Breed Register.

See also
 Dogs portal
 List of dog breeds

References

External links

Réunion des Amateurs de Braque d'Auvergne - in french
Braque d'Auvergne gallery

FCI breeds
Dog breeds originating in France
Gundogs
Pointers
Rare dog breeds